Calais–Dunkerque Airport   is an airport located in Marck,  east-northeast of Calais, in the Pas-de-Calais department in the Hauts-de-France region of France. The airport also serves Dunkerque (a commune in the Nord department).

History
In the 1950s and early 1960s, the airport was busy with cross-channel service, including car ferry flights, by private airlines such as Silver City Airways and Channel Air Bridge, later merged into British United Air Ferries.

On 9 July 2015, the Airbus E-Fan landed at Calais–Dunkerque Airport after a flight from Lydd Airport. Initially this was claimed as the first electric aircraft to cross the English Channel, but it has since been pointed out that there were previous such flights, including one as long ago as 1981.

Statistics

Facilities
It has one paved runway designated 06/24 which measures .

References

External links
 Aéroport Grand Calais
 
 

Airports in Hauts-de-France
Airport
Transport in Pas-de-Calais
Buildings and structures in Pas-de-Calais